Monstrotyphis takashigei is a species of sea snail, a marine gastropod mollusk, in the family Muricidae, the murex snails or rock snails.

Description
The length of the shell attains 7.3 mm.

Distribution
This marine species occurs off Japan.

References

takashigei
Gastropods described in 2016